Cognetti may refer to:

 Paige Cognetti, U.S. politician serving as the 36th Mayor of Scranton, Pennsylvania
 Paolo Cognetti (born 1978), Italian writer